María Elena Durazo (born March 20, 1953) is an American politician serving in the California State Senate. A Democrat, she represents the 24th State Senate district, which encompasses Central Los Angeles and East Los Angeles.

Prior to being elected to the State Senate, she was an American trade union official. She served as the Executive Secretary-Treasurer of the Los Angeles County Federation of Labor from May 2006 until December 2014. She currently serves as the Executive Vice President of the governing Executive Council of the national AFL-CIO and as a Vice Chair of the Democratic National Committee.

Biography

Early career

Like many others who have come to play a role of the labor movement in California, Durazo got her start amongst farmworkers. As the daughter of Mexican immigrants, she spent summers in the Central Valley fields picking peaches, strawberries, and grapes. Cesar Chavez, founder of the United Farmworkers of America, inspired her to get involved in the fight for equal rights. Durazo attended St. Mary's College in Moraga, California and graduated in 1975. In 1985, she graduated from the Peoples College of Law in Los Angeles, before beginning her involvement in the labor movement as an organizer for the International Ladies' Garment Workers' Union.

In 1983, she joined the Hotel Employees and Restaurant Employees Union (HERE) Local 11. In 1987, Durazo led a reform slate against the entrenched local leadership of Andrew (Scotty) Allen whose administration had resisted efforts of immigrant workers to participate in local governance. Durazo appeared to have the upper hand, but the election was set aside by the international union, and the local was placed in a trusteeship led by Miguel Contreras. In 1988, she married fellow union activist Miguel Contreras whom she met while at HERE Local 11. Soon thereafter, in May 1989, Maria Elena ran for and was elected President of Local 11. She served in that capacity from 1989 to 2006. Years later, Durazo won the local presidency with 85% of the vote becoming one of the first Latinas to lead a major union. From May 1989 until March 2006, Durazo served as the president of Local 11. In 1993, during the union's campaign against the New Otani Hotel, (the first hotel to be built non-union in downtown Los Angeles) Durazo led workers on civil disobedience protests. Her participation in the sit-in protest led to her being arrested along with several other New Otani workers, many of whom were dragged away by police officers. She was later elected onto the executive board of HERE International Union in 1996, and in 2004 was elected Executive Vice President of UNITE-HERE International.

From 2000 to 2004, she served on the National AFL-CIO's Immigration Committee and is now the current Chair of the committee. In 2003, Durazo became the National Director of the Immigrant Workers' Freedom Ride.

Executive Secretary-Treasurer

In 2005 she became the widow of Miguel Contreras, who preceded Ludlow as the executive secretary-treasurer of the Los Angeles County Federation of Labor, AFL-CIO. The Los Angeles County Federation of Labor represents 600,000 workers, and it reached the climax of its influence under Durazo, its first women leader. Durazo helped land allies on the Los Angeles City Council and county Board of Supervisors and recently pushed through a minimum wage law requiring large Los Angeles hotels to pay workers at least $15.37 an hour one of the nations highest base wages. Durazo was appointed as the interim Executive Secretary-Treasurer following the resignation of Martin Ludlow in February 2006, and was voted as the permanent replacement on May 15, 2006. On August 4, 2010, she was reelected as Executive Secretary-Treasurer of the AFL-CIO.

In October 2014, Durazo left the Los Angeles County Federation of Labor to take a national union job promoting civil rights and campaigning for immigration reform. With her lead, the Los Angeles labor movement has indeed been a powerful voice and effective force for working families, she was active in elections and policy debates as well as at the workplace.

On January 15, 2008 Durazo endorsed Barack Obama for president, and took a three-week leave of absence from her job as Executive Secretary-Treasurer of the Los Angeles County Federation of Labor in order to campaign for Obama. She then became a national co-chair of the Obama for President campaign committee, and was a pledged delegate for Obama at the National Convention in Denver. She served as Vice Chair on the 2008 Democratic National Convention Committee.

On August 11, 2008, Durazo was elected to serve as the new chair of the UCLA Labor Center advisory committee. The vote was by acclamation.

In 2010, Durazo was elected onto the national AFL-CIO Executive Council as an Executive Vice President. She was elected as a Vice Chair of the Democratic National Committee in 2013.

California State Senate 
On April 6, 2017, Durazo announced that she intended to run for the 24th district of the California State Senate in 2018, when the incumbent, Kevin de León was termed out. In her announcement, she stated that Donald Trump's victory in the 2016 presidential elections was her main motivation for running for public office.

Honors
Capitol Weekly named Maria Elena the third most influential non-elected California official in its 2010 Top 100 List.

Durazo was named Most Valuable Local Labor Leader by The Nation magazine in their 2014 Progressive Honor Roll.

Durazo was conferred an Honorary Doctor of Humane Letters from the California State University Board of Trustees. "We are very proud to award Maria Elena Durazo the honorary degree of Doctor of Humane Letters for 2014. Her significant impacts on the quality of life in this region demonstrate what can be achieved through dedication, hard work, and a commitment to community," said President William A. Covino.

The New York Times acknowledged that "as the executive secretary-treasurer of the Los Angeles County Federation of Labor, she presides over what is widely perceived as the most successful group of unions in the country."

The Los Angeles Times' featured stories reporter Joe Mozingo wrote that "Maria Elena Durazo is probably the single most influential individual in Los Angeles politics."

CNN's top news anchor in the Spanish language, Ismael Cala, stated on-air that "We are proud that a woman who has had on her life story the opportunity to see from the field the issue of immigrants' rights has become a voice for so many who cannot raise their own voices."

Footnotes

Further reading

External links
 
 
 Maria Elena Durazo at the Center for Labor Research and Education at UCLA
 Join California Maria Elena Durazo

Democratic Party California state senators
Women state legislators in California
Hispanic and Latino American state legislators in California
Hispanic and Latino American women in politics
Mexican-American people in California politics
21st-century American women politicians
American trade union leaders
Trade unionists from California
American trade unionists of Mexican descent
American workers' rights activists
Hispanic and Latino American activists
Activists from Los Angeles
People's College of Law alumni
Saint Mary's College of California alumni
1953 births
Living people